The Medellín River, called Porce River during most of its course, is a river that flows through the Colombian city of Medellín and its metropolitan area. For many years an organization called Mi Río (My River) was involved in river cleanup projects.

For the river's first , it is referred to as the Medellín, and after that it is known as the Porce. It is a tributary of the Nechi River, which flows in turn into the Cauca River.

Every year, the Christmas lighting of Medellín takes place on the Medellín River.

Porce III Dam 
The river is the site of the Porce III Dam, which was completed in 2011.

References 

Rivers of Colombia